Catherine E. Karkov is professor of History of Art and head of the School of Fine Art, History of Art and Cultural Studies at the University of Leeds. Her research centres on early medieval art, especially Anglo-Saxon art, and she has published three monographs. Her first concerns Anglo-Saxon art; the second one on the relation between text and image in Anglo-Saxon literature; and the third on how Anglo-Saxon writers imagined England as a place, how Anglo-Saxon England is understood by modern audiences, and the "fraught history of 'Anglo-Saxon' studies".

Work 
Her second book focuses on MS Junius 11, she argues that a complete edition of the manuscript leaves out the many illustrations at its own peril; these illustrations occur at dramatic moments in the four poems and help elucidate the allegorical import of many passages.

As editor of Slow Scholarship, Karkov highlighted the ways in which research quality is measured in the UK (via the Research Excellence Framework), over work, publishing models which reward research that aligns with the status quo, an increasingly precarious workforce in Higher Education all contribute to making new and innovative scholarship difficult. The collection developed theories from the Slow Food movement to propose ways of creating thoughtful, new scholarship.

Publications

Monographs
Imagining Anglo-Saxon England: Utopia, Heterotopia, Dystopia (Boydell, 2020) 
Slow Scholarship: Medieval Research and the Neoliberal University (Boydell, 2019) 
The Art of Anglo-Saxon England (Boydell, 2011) 
The Ruler Portraits of Anglo-Saxon England (Boydell, 2004) 
Text and Picture in Anglo-Saxon England: Narrative Strategies in the Junius 11 Manuscript (Cambridge UP, 2001)

Edited
Disturbing Times: Medieval Pasts, Reimagined Futures (Punctum Books: 2020, with Anna Kłosowska and Vincent W.J. van Gerven Oei) 
Cross and Cruciform in the Anglo-Saxon World: Studies to Honor the Memory of Timothy Reuter (Morgantown: West Virginia UP, 2010; with Sarah Keefer and Karen Jolly) 
Poetry, Place and Gender: Studies in Medieval Culture in Honor of Helen Damico (Kalamazoo: Medieval Institute Press, 2009) 
Early Medieval Studies in Memory of Patrick Wormald (Farnham: Ashgate, 2009, with S. Baxter and J. Nelson) 
Cross and Culture in Anglo-Saxon England (Morgantown: West Virginia UniUP, 2008, with Sarah Keefer and Karen Jolly)

References

External links
Catherine E. Karkov's page at the University of Leeds

Living people
Academics of the University of Leeds
Year of birth missing (living people)
British women academics
Women medievalists